Salvador Arellano Guzmán (born 30 August 1957) is a Mexican politician affiliated with the PRI. He currently serves as Deputy of the LXII Legislature of the Mexican Congress representing Jalisco.

References

1957 births
Living people
Politicians from Guadalajara, Jalisco
Institutional Revolutionary Party politicians
21st-century Mexican politicians
20th-century Mexican politicians
Members of the Congress of Jalisco
Deputies of the LXII Legislature of Mexico
Members of the Chamber of Deputies (Mexico) for Jalisco